Percival Gray (5 January 1889 – November 1944) was an Australian naval officer. During his early career he served on the Worcester and the Archibald Russell, and then joined the New Zealand Shipping Company.

From 1909 to 1911, he worked for the Peninsular and Oriental Steam Navigation Company. During this time he attained his first officer's certificate.

Cape Gray, in King George V Land in Antarctica, was named after him by Sir Douglas Mawson.

References 

1889 births
1944 deaths
Australasian Antarctic Expedition
Australian sailors
People from Bowral